Lee Seung-Chul (born 22 July 1988 in Jeollanam) is a South Korean wrestler who competed at the 2012 Summer Olympics in the men's -60 kg freestyle category.

References

External links
 

1988 births
South Korean male sport wrestlers
Wrestlers at the 2012 Summer Olympics
Olympic wrestlers of South Korea
Living people
Wrestlers at the 2010 Asian Games
Wrestlers at the 2014 Asian Games
Asian Games medalists in wrestling
Asian Games bronze medalists for South Korea
Sportspeople from South Jeolla Province
Medalists at the 2014 Asian Games
Wrestlers at the 2018 Asian Games
21st-century South Korean people